Danascara Creek is a river that flows into the Mohawk River by Auriesville, New York. The creek begins southeast of Johnstown and flows in a generally southeast direction before converging with the Mohawk River by Tribes Hill.

References 

Rivers of Montgomery County, New York
Mohawk River
Rivers of New York (state)